Zbigniew Czerwiński may refer to:

 Zbigniew Czerwiński (speedway rider) (born 1982), Polish motorcycle speedway rider
 Zbigniew Czerwiński, Polish general
 Zbigniew Czerwiński, 2006 member of the Greater Poland Regional Assembly